Gress is a surname. Notable people with the surname include:

David Gress (born 1953), Danish historian
Drew Gress (born 1959), American jazz double-bassist and composer
Elsa Gress (1919–1988), Danish writer and dramatist
Gilbert Gress (born 1941), French footballer and manager
Jesse Gress, American rock guitarist
Stefan Gress, German plastic surgeon